Ninan is a village in the Bhiwani district of the Indian state of Haryana. , the village had 293 households with a total population of 1,594 of which 836 were male and 758 female.

References

Villages in Bhiwani district